Joshua Huw Adams (born 21 April 1995) is a Welsh professional rugby union player who primarily plays wing for Cardiff in the United Rugby Championship. He has also represented Wales at international level, having made his test debut against Scotland during the 2018 Six Nations Championship. Adams has previously played for clubs such as Worcester Warriors in the past.

Club career
Adams began his career with Llanelli and made his debut against Pontypridd in 2013. He went on to make a total of 30 appearances for the club, scoring 9 tries. He made his first and only Scarlets appearance in the Anglo-Welsh Cup defeat to Cardiff Rugby in 2014. He is also a previous Wales U20 international.

In May 2014, it was announced that Adams would move to Worcester from the 2015–16 season. In February 2016, Adams moved on loan to National League 1 side Cinderford until the end of the 2015–16 season.

On 22 December 2017, Adams scored two tries in a 23–8 win over relegation rivals London Irish, making him the top try scorer in the Premiership around the close of December 2017.

On 19 March 2019, Cardiff Rugby announced the signing of Adams on a long-term contract from the start of the 2019-2020 Pro14 season.

International career

Wales
In January 2018, Adams was called up to the Wales senior squad for the 2018 Six Nations Championship, and on 30 January he was named in the starting line-up for Wales' opening game at home to Scotland.

On 23 February 2019, Adams sealed a Six Nations third round win for Wales against England at the Cardiff's Millennium Stadium. A cross field kick from Welsh teammate Dan Biggar was gathered in the air by Adams and grounded. It was Adam's third try for Wales and meant England were all but defeated in the match. With Wales moving to first, heading into the fourth week of the 2019 Six Nations Championship. Wales won the Six Nations grand slam.

On 9 October 2019 Adams scored a hat-trick in a 29–17 win over Fiji at the 2019 Rugby World Cup. The win secured Wales's place in the quarter finals. Adams ended the 2019 Rugby World Cup in Japan as the top try-scorer for the competition.

On 1 February 2020 Adams scored a hat-trick for Wales in the 42-0 Six Nations win over Italy.

Adams was chosen for the 2022 Six Nations Championship, achieving tries against both England and Italy. He won Player of the Match against Italy, but gave this honour to Ange Capuozzo after the match.

British and Irish Lions
On 6 May 2021, Adams was selected to represent the British & Irish Lions in the 2021 tour to South Africa. At the time of selection, Adams wife Georgia was heavily pregnant and could have impacted his availability for the tour however a mutual decision was reached for him to participate.

On 26 June 2021, Adams made his Lions debut in a pre-tour warm up match against Japan at Murrayfield. Adams scored the opening try of the game as the Lions ran out 28-10 winners. Adams was then selected to play in the first provincial game of the tour against the Sigma Lions on 3 July 2021. Adams finished the game having scored four tries, becoming the first Lion since Shane Williams in 2005 to do so. Following Covid complications, Adams was drafted into the side for the following tour game against Cell C Sharks. Starting in an unfamiliar role at fullback, Adams maintained his strong start to the tour by scoring a hattrick of tries, taking his total to eight from three games.

International tries

References

External links

1995 births
Living people
Cardiff Rugby players
Rugby union players from Swansea
Scarlets players
Wales international rugby union players
Welsh rugby union players
Worcester Warriors players
Rugby union wings
Nottingham R.F.C. players
British & Irish Lions rugby union players from Wales